Parliamentary elections were held in Uzbekistan on 21 December 2014, with a second round on 4 January 2015, alongside provincial and district council elections. The Uzbekistan Liberal Democratic Party remained the largest party, winning 52 of the 135 elected seats in the Legislative Chamber.

Electoral system
Of the 150 members of the Legislative Chamber, 135 were directly elected from single member constituencies using the two-round system. A further 15 seats were reserved for the country's Ecological Movement, which elected its members at a meeting on 21 December.

Results
Of the 135 elected seats, 113 were won by candidates in the first round. The remaining 22 seats were filled when run-off elections took place on 4 January 2015.

References

External links
Central Election Commission of the Republic of Uzbekistan

Uzbekistan
Uzbeikistan
Elections in Uzbekistan
2014 in Uzbekistan
2015 in Uzbekistan
Election and referendum articles with incomplete results